Yinzhen tea may refer to:

Baihao Yinzhen tea, a white tea
Junshan Yinzhen tea, a yellow tea